Dolores María Fonzi (born 19 July 1978) is an Argentine TV, theatre and film actress. Several of her films have received critical acclaim such as Burnt Money, Waiting for the Messiah, Bottom of the Sea and The Aura. Her brother Tomás Fonzi is also an actor in Argentina.

Biography 
Dolores Fonzi was born in Buenos Aires, Argentina. After the separation of her parents, her mother, María del Rosario Cárrega, returned with her children to Adrogué, a city where Dolores and her brothers Tomás and Diego grew up. She studied acting at the school of Carlos Gandolfo.

Career 
In 1996, when she was seventeen years old, Dolores Fonzi made her first television appearance in the series La nena. In 1998, Cris Morena chose her to play Clara Vázquez in Verano del '98 with her brother, who played Benjamín Vázquez. Thanks to this successful series and her character as a villain, she gained great popularity and success. At the end of 1999 she left Verano del '98 to be part of the cast of the movie of Marcelo Piñeyro, Burnt Money and in Waiting for the Messiah. In 2001, she had great recognition by integrating the cast of El sodero de mi vida in Canal 13, where she played a girl with a slight mental retardation. Experimenting with Luis Ortega the tape Caja negra is born, where she acted and participated in the integral creation. She later acted in movies like  Vidas privadas, Bottom of the Sea, The Aura, La mujer rota, Salamandra, El club de la muerte and El campo, for the latter she was nominated for the Silver Condor Awards for Best Actress. In 2003 she starred in the unitary series Disputas and in the adaptation of the play of John Ford, Lástima que sea una puta. The following year she starred with Mariano Martínez the terror unit, Sangre fría by Telefe. 

During 2006, Fonzi starred and produced the miniseries Soy tu fan which in 2010 was adapted by Canana Films in Mexico. She also starred in the series El tiempo no para by Canal 9. From 2005 to 2008 she participated in three chapters of Mujeres asesinas. Her return to television was in 2012 with her participation in  Graduados the new Underground production for Telefe. In addition, she was part of the unit of TV Pública En terapia with the actors Norma Aleandro, Diego Peretti, Leonardo Sbaraglia, Ailín Salas, Julieta Cardinali and Germán Palacios. She also resumed the theater as the protagonist of the play Isósceles. That year, she also made the filming of El Crítico by Hernán Guerschuny, a co-production between HC Films and Lagarto Cine where Dolores Fonzi had the lead alongside Rafael Spregelburd. On television she participated as a guest actress in two episodes of the series Aliados. 

In 2015 Fonzi starred in the film Paulina, remake of the film starring Mirtha Legrand, in 1960. The film had a strong box office collection and favorable reviews, being praised at the Cannes Festival. For her work in the film, Fonzi was awarded the Havana Star Prize for Best Actress at the 17th Havana Film Festival New York. She also acted in Truman film starring Ricardo Darín. In 2016 she was part of the cast of the series of La Leona, she play Eugenia Leone.

Personal life 
Dolores Fonzi started dating Gael García Bernal after they met on the set of the 2001 film directed by Fito Páez, Vidas Privadas. In January 2009, their first child was born in Madrid, Spain. Their daughter was born in April 2011 in Buenos Aires, Argentina.

Filmography

Television

Movies

Theater

Videoclips

References

External links 
 

1978 births
Argentine television actresses
Argentine film actresses
Actresses from Buenos Aires
Living people
Place of birth missing (living people)
20th-century Argentine actresses
21st-century Argentine actresses